Graphium alebion is a butterfly found in China that belongs to the swallowtail family.

Description
This insect is similar to Iphiclides podalirius, but the cell of the forewing is traversed by one more band, and the band situated on the cross-veins is not continued to the hind angle as in I. podalirius. On the hindwing the black portion of the anal ocellus is reduced to a minute line, while the yellow colour forms a large spot.

Subspecies
G. a. alebion (Gray, 1853)
G. a. chungiyanus Murayama Taiwan

References

Butterflies described in 1853
alebion
Palearctic Lepidoptera
Taxa named by George Robert Gray